Zanjoe Acuesta Marudo (born July 23, 1982) is a Filipino actor and model. He began his career after finishing as the 4th Big Placer of Pinoy Big Brother: Celebrity Edition 1 (2006). Since then he has starred in the TV series' Lovers in Paris (2009), Precious Hearts Romances Presents: Kristine (2010), Annaliza (2013), Dream Dad (2014), Tubig at Langis (2016) and My Dear Heart (2017).

Aside from his roles in television he is also known for his roles in films such as You Got Me! (2007), Kimmy Dora: Kambal sa Kiyeme (2009), Kimmy Dora and the Temple of Kiyeme (2012), One More Try (2012), Bromance: My Brother's Romance (2013), Maria Leonora Teresa (2014) and The Third Party (2016).

Marudo is a contract artist of ABS-CBN's Star Magic.

Early life
Marudo was born in Bilogbilog, Tanauan, Batangas. His father, Zósimo Lumbres Marudo hails from Batangas while his mother, Rosanna Acuesta, is a native of Calauag, Quezon. He is the third of their five children.

From elementary school until high school, he played in the basketball varsity team under the influence of his brother Zandro. He was with the San Sebastian College Staglets, playing in the NCAA.

Career
He joined a modeling contest, Body Shots, and won the first runner-up title. He joined Pinoy Big Brother: Celebrity Edition, coming in fourth place with actors John Prats, Bianca Gonzalez and Keana Reeves. He then signed his acting contract with ABS-CBN.

Marudo became a model after high school. He appeared in the Bench Fever fashion show. In Philippine Cosmopolitan Magazine (September 2006 issue), Marudo is one of the 10 centerfold men in the "Cosmopolitan 69 Bachelors and 10 Centerfolds" supplement.

Marudo was with the ABS-CBN comedy series Aalog-Alog (Jiggling) with Pinoy Big Brother: Celebrity Edition housemates John Prats, Keanna Reeves, and Pinoy Big Brother runner-up Jason Gainza and in the fantasy series Super Inggo as Super Islaw. He was seen in  Florinda (TV series) with Maricel Soriano.

In January 2011 (after the Christmas and New Year holidays), Marudo announced his departure from Bench following his decision not to renew his contract due to busy commitments.

Filmography

Film

Television

Awards and nominations

References

External links
 

1982 births
21st-century Filipino male actors
Filipino male television actors
Filipino male models
Living people
Male actors from Batangas
Pinoy Big Brother contestants
People from Tanauan, Batangas
Basketball players from Batangas
Tagalog people
Star Magic
ABS-CBN personalities
San Sebastian College – Recoletos alumni
Filipino male film actors
Filipino male comedians